Ian McDonald (born 1960) is a British science fiction novelist, living in Belfast. His themes include nanotechnology, postcyberpunk settings, and the impact of rapid social and technological change on non-Western societies.

Early life
Ian McDonald was born in 1960, in Manchester, to a Scottish father and Irish mother. He moved to Belfast when he was five and has lived there ever since. He lived through the whole of the 'Troubles' (1968–1999), and his sensibility has been permanently shaped by coming to understand Northern Ireland as a post-colonial society imposed on an older culture.

Career
McDonald sold his first story to a local Belfast magazine when he was 22, and in 1987 became a full-time writer. He has also worked in TV consultancy within Northern Ireland, contributing scripts to the Northern Irish Sesame Workshop production of Sesame Tree.

McDonald's debut novel was Desolation Road (1988), which takes place on a far future Mars in a town that develops around an oasis in the terraformed Martian desert. He published a sequel, Ares Express, in 2001.

Published between 1995 and 2000, the novels Chaga (US title Evolution's Shore) and Kirinya, with the novella Tendeléo's Story, form the 'Chaga Saga', which chronicles the effects of an alien flora introduced to Earth, and also analyses the AIDS crisis in Africa. The protagonist is Ulster journalist Gaby McAslin, whose outsider's eye both observes the African landscape and sees what the "UN quarantine zone" is doing to Kenya and Kenyans. Gaby's story, with that of her daughter, continues in Kirinya. Tendeléo's Story is seen through the eyes of a young Kenyan girl who escapes to the UK, only to be deported back to Kenya as an unwanted alien.

McDonald's  River of Gods (2004) is set in mid-21st-century India; it won the BSFA award, and was nominated for a Hugo Award and a Clarke Award. Brasyl (2007) is set in the 18th and 21st centuries in Lusophone South America; it won the BSFA award, and was nominated for a Hugo Award and the Warwick Prize for Writing. McDonald began his Everness series of young adult fiction novels in 2011 with Planesrunner. He said in a 2014 interview, "I didn't want to get stuck doing the same SF books over and over, successful though they may be. I didn't want to keep writing books about the developing economy of the year—India, Brazil. I could feel myself getting trapped in that." He has written two Everness sequels, Be My Enemy (2012), and Empress of the Sun (2014).

McDonald published Luna: New Moon, the first volume of a proposed science fiction duology, in 2015. It explores the dangerous intrigue that surrounds the five powerful families who control industry on the Moon. McDonald said of the novel in August 2014, "I’m still writing about developing economies, it’s just that this one happens to be on the Moon." Before critics called the novel "Game of Thrones in space", McDonald himself dubbed it "Game of Domes" and "Dallas in space". Luna was optioned for development as a television series before its release. The sequel, Luna: Wolf Moon, was released in March 2017. A third novel, Luna: Moon Rising, was released in March 2019. McDonald previously published the novelette "The Fifth Dragon", a prequel to Luna in the same setting, in the 2014 anthology Reach for Infinity.

McDonald's Time Was, a time travel romance novella about two men, was released in April 2018.

Awards

Won
 Locus Award – First Novel (1989): Desolation Road
 Philip K. Dick Award – Best Collection (1991): King of Morning, Queen of Day
 British Science Fiction Association Award – Best Short Fiction (1992): Innocents
 Kurd-Laßwitz-Preis (1999): Sacrifice of Fools
 Theodore Sturgeon Award (2001): Tendeléo's Story
 British Science Fiction Association Award – Best Novel (2004): River of Gods
 Hugo Award for Best Novelette (2007): The Djinn's Wife
 British Science Fiction Association Award – Best Novel (2007): Brasyl
 John W. Campbell Memorial Award for Best Science Fiction Novel (2011): The Dervish House
 British Science Fiction Association Award – Best Novel (2011): The Dervish House
 Gaylactic Spectrum Award – Best Novel (2016): Luna: New Moon

Nominations
 Nebula Award for Best Novelette (1989): Unfinished Portrait of the King of Pain by Van Gogh

 Arthur C. Clarke Award  – Best Novel (1990): Desolation Road
 Locus Fantasy Award (1992): King of Morning, Queen of Day
 Arthur C. Clarke Award – Best Novel (1993): Hearts, Hands, and Voices
 British Science Fiction Award (1992): Hearts, Hands, and Voices
 World Fantasy Award for Best Short Fiction (1994) : Some Strange Desire
 Philip K. Dick Award (1994) : Scissors Cut Paper Wrap Stone
 British Science Fiction Association Award – Best Novel (1994) : Necroville
 British Science Fiction Association Award – Best Novel (1995): Chaga
 The John W. Campbell Memorial Award (1996): Chaga
 Arthur C. Clarke Award – Best Novel (2005): River of Gods
 Hugo Award – Best Novel (2005): River of Gods
 Hugo Award – Best Novel (2008): Brasyl
 Warwick Prize for Writing (2008/9) and reached prize longlist announced in November 2008: Brasyl
 The John W. Campbell Memorial Award (2008): Brasyl
 Locus SF Award (2008): Brasyl
 Nebula Award (2008): Brasyl
 Hugo Award – Best Novel (2011): The Dervish House
 Locus Award – Best Science Fiction Novel (2011): The Dervish House
 Arthur C. Clarke Award – Best Novel (2011): The Dervish House
 British Science Fiction Association Award – Best Novel (2015): Luna: New Moon
 Philip K. Dick Award (2018): Time Was
  Locus Award – Best Science Fiction Novel (2018): Luna: Wolf Moon
 Locus Award – Best Science Fiction Novel (2020): Luna: Moon Rising

Selected bibliography

Desolation Road series
 Desolation Road (1988)
 Ares Express (2001)

Chaga saga
 Chaga (1995, US: Evolution's Shore)
 Kirinya (1997)

India in 2047
 River of Gods (2004) – Hugo Award nominee, Clarke Award nominee, winner of the BSFA award
 Cyberabad Days (2009) (collection)

Everness series
 Planesrunner (2011)
 Be My Enemy (2012)
 Empress of the Sun (2014)

Luna series
 Luna: New Moon (2015) – BSFA award nominee, winner of the Gaylactic Spectrum Award
 Luna: Wolf Moon (2017)
 Luna: Moon Rising (2019)
 The Menace from Farside (novella) (2019)

Other novels
 Out on Blue Six (1989)
 King of Morning, Queen of Day (1991)
 Hearts, Hands and Voices (1992, US: The Broken Land)
 Necroville (1994, US: Terminal Café)
 Sacrifice of Fools (1996)
 Brasyl (2007) – Hugo Award nominee, winner of the BSFA award, Nominated for the £50,000 Warwick Prize for Writing
 The Dervish House (2010) – Hugo Award nominee, Clarke Award nominee, winner of the BSFA award
 Time Was (2018)

Blog and online interviews

References

External resources

 
 Ian McDonald at Fantastic Fiction

1960 births
Living people
20th-century British writers
20th-century writers from Northern Ireland
21st-century British writers
21st-century writers from Northern Ireland
Hugo Award-winning writers
Male novelists from Northern Ireland
Science fiction writers from Northern Ireland
Writers from Belfast
Writers from Manchester